Khaibar Amani (Dari: خیبر امانی; born 6 February 1987) is an Afghan football player currently playing for FC Hanau 93.

Club career
Amani previously has played for Kickers Offenbach, 1. FSV Mainz 05 II, Rot-Weiß Hadamar and TGM SV Jügesheim. Amani joined FC Hanau 93 in May 2018.

International career
Amani did get called up against Japan. He made his debut against Japan but they lost 6–0. After this match he played against Singapore and scored a goals against Cambodia. He also was called up for the matches in the 2015 SAFF Championship. He made an impressive beginning and scored 1 goal against Bangladesh and 2 goals against Bhutan. In the semi-final against Sri Lanka he scored from the penalty spot and is currently the topscorer of the tournament with 4 goals.

International goals
Scores and results list Afghanistan's goal tally first.

References

External links
 
 Khaibar Amani at Fupa

Afghan men's footballers
Afghanistan international footballers
German footballers
German people of Afghan descent
Sportspeople of Afghan descent
Living people
1987 births
Association football forwards
TGM SV Jügesheim players
SC Hessen Dreieich players
Hessenliga players
Footballers from Frankfurt